Paul Kerr Baldwin (born 18 July 1973) is an English cricket umpire. He was born in Epsom in Surrey.

Baldwin started umpiring in 2000 and was appointed to the ICC Associates and Affiliates International Umpires Panel in 2005. He made his ODI officiating debut on 5 August 2006, in the match between Scotland and Ireland. He has officiated in 18 ODIs and 9 International T20s. Baldwin moved back to England for the 2009 season where his performances throughout the season earned him a place on the ECB's list of reserve first-class umpires.

See also
 List of One Day International cricket umpires
 List of Twenty20 International cricket umpires

References

External links

1973 births
Living people
People from Surrey
English One Day International cricket umpires
English Twenty20 International cricket umpires